Oumar Ngom (born 9 March 2004) is a professional footballer who plays for  club Niort. Born in France, he is a youth international for Mauritania.

Club career 
Having grown up between Tillou and Chef-Boutonne, Oumar Ngom went through the youth ranks of the Niort, starting to play with the reserve team in National 3 during the 2021–22 season.

First appearing in the main team squad in early 2022, he made his professional debut for Niort on 5 March 2022, replacing Nacim El Hassani at the 61st  minute of a 0–1 Ligue 2 home loss to AC Ajaccio.

International career 
Of Senegalese and Mauritanian descent—his father, Cheikh Ngom, was a Mauritania international in the '80s—, he became a youth international for his father's country, playing the Africa U-17 Cup of Nations qualification in 2021 and scoring a goal despite his team failing to reach the final tournament.

References

External links

Niort profile

2004 births
Sportspeople from Deux-Sèvres
Footballers from Nouvelle-Aquitaine
Mauritanian people of Senegalese descent
French sportspeople of Mauritanian descent
French sportspeople of Senegalese descent
Living people
French footballers
Mauritanian footballers
Mauritania youth international footballers
Association football midfielders
Chamois Niortais F.C. players
Ligue 2 players
Championnat National 3 players